The Canton of L'Île-Rousse is one of the cantons of the Haute-Corse department, France. It is entirely in the arrondissement of Calvi. in Since the French canton reorganisation which came into effect in March 2015, the communes of the canton of L'Île-Rousse are:

Belgodère
Corbara
Costa
Feliceto
L'Île-Rousse
Lama
Mausoléo
Monticello
Muro
Nessa
Novella
Occhiatana
Olmi-Cappella
Palasca
Pigna 
Pioggiola
Santa-Reparata-di-Balagna
Speloncato
Urtaca
Vallica
Ville-di-Paraso

References

Ile-Rousse